Nagykanizsa Futball Club is a Hungarian football club from the town of Nagykanizsa.

History
Nagykanizsa FC debuted in the 1994–95 season of the Hungarian League and finished fifteenth.

Name Changes 
1945–1949: Nagykanizsai MAORT Munkás SE
1945 – 1949: Olajmunkás SE
1949 – 1951: Nagykanizsai Bányász SK
1951 – 1957: Nagykanizsai Zrinyi Olajbánybányász SC
1957 – 1959: Nagykanizsai Bányász
1959 – 1966: Nagykanizsai Olajbányász SE
1966 – 1996: Olajbányász Futball Club Nagykanizsa
1996 – 1998: 1. Futball Club Nagykanizsa
1998 – 2000: Nagykanizsa-LinAir FC
2000: Nagykanizsa FC
2000 – 2002: Kögáz-Nagykanizsa FC

References

External links
 Profil

Football clubs in Hungary
1945 establishments in Hungary
Mining association football clubs in Hungary